Interstate 37 (I-37) is a  Interstate Highway located within the southern portion of the US state of Texas. The highway was first designated in 1959 as a route between Corpus Christi and San Antonio. Construction in the urban areas of Corpus Christi and San Antonio began in the 1960s, and the segments of the Interstate Highway in rural areas were completed by the 1980s. Prior to I-37, the route between Corpus Christi and San Antonio was served by a combination of State Highway 9 (SH 9) from Corpus Christi to Three Rivers and U.S. Highway 281 (US 281) from Three Rivers to San Antonio. As a result of the construction of I-37, SH 9 was removed from the State Highway System.

The highway begins in Corpus Christi at US 181 and SH 35 and heads north to San Antonio, where it ends at I-35. Beyond I-35, the freeway continues as US 281 to northern San Antonio as a major freeway. In Corpus Christi, the highway provides access to the downtown area, the Port of Corpus Christi, and the Corpus Christi International Airport. In San Antonio, it provides access to Downtown, Brooks, the Alamodome, the Tower of the Americas, the River Walk, the Alamo, and, by extension via US 281, the San Antonio International Airport. The route provides an important connection between I-35 and the Texas Gulf Coast as well as one of the few limited-access hurricane evacuation routes away from the southern Texas coast.

Route description
I-37 starts near the Gulf Coast in Corpus Christi and heads northwest toward San Antonio. It links South Texas to the northern parts of the state via I-69E, US 77, and US 281. The highway functions as one of the few freeway hurricane evacuation routes for the southern Texas coast. It roughly parallels US 181, which both begins and ends at I-37, and US 281.

Unofficially, I-37 begins at an intersection with Shoreline Boulevard on the edge of Corpus Christi Bay. It then heads west as a surface street for three blocks where it becomes entrance and exit ramps which connect to the freeway. I-37 begins officially at the gore point for these ramps, which is part of an interchange complex that also represents the southern ends of US 181 and SH 35.

It heads west from US 181 through Corpus Christi and intersects two freeways, SH 286 (the Crosstown Expressway) at exit 1C and SH 358 (Padre Island Drive) at exit 4A. The highway turns toward the northwest after the SH 358 interchange roughly parallel to the south of the Nueces River. Just prior to leaving the Corpus Christi city limits, it intersects and has a short concurrency with US 77 (future I-69E). US 77 (future I-69E) merges with I-37 as a freeway from the south at exit 14A northbound and exit 14 southbound; the two continue to the north and split after crossing the Nueces River. The Interstate continues to the northwest as US 77 (future I-69E) continues to the northeast at exit 17.

I-37 transitions to a rural setting once outside of the Corpus Christi city limits on its way to Mathis and Lake Corpus Christi. It continues on to the northwest and intersects US 59 (future I-69W) east of George West at exit 56. It begins paralleling US 281 to the east before the two intersect at exit 72 and have a concurrency north of Three Rivers near Choke Canyon Reservoir. Alternate U.S. Highway 281 (Alt. US 281) splits off from I-37 near Sunniland at exit 76 and parallels I-37 before rejoining north of Campbellton at exit 92 southbound. The two routes remain concurrent until US 281 splits off at exit 104 northbound to head to Pleasanton, while I-37 bypasses the city to the east. After US 281 leaves toward the northwest, I-37 turns to the north toward San Antonio.

As I-37 enters the San Antonio city limits, it intersects the northern terminus of US 181 at exit 132 southbound. Continuing to the north, it intersects I-410, the inner loop around San Antonio, at exit 133 at a stack interchange. At this junction, the Interstate once again runs concurrently with US 281 which had been concurrent with I-410. Heading north through the southside of San Antonio, I-37 provides access to Brooks City-Base (formerly Brooks AFB). After exit 135, a cloverleaf interchange at State Highway Loop 13 (Loop 13), the freeway turns toward the northwest. The highway intersects I-10, which is concurrent with US 90 and US 87, at exit 139 at a stack interchange on the southeastern corner of Downtown. After the interchange, it once again heads north on the eastside of Downtown. It passes near the Alamodome, the Tower of the Americas, the River Walk, and the Alamo. I-37 ends at the northeastern corner of Downtown at exits 142A and 142B at a junction with I-35. US 281 continues to the north as a freeway and provides access to the San Antonio International Airport and later far north central Texas.

From I-410 to I-10 in San Antonio, I-37 is designated the Lucian Adams Freeway, after the World War II veteran. Adams is a native of Port Arthur and received the Medal of Honor for his service in France, along with the Bronze Star and Purple Heart, for his gallantry during the Cassino Campaign. From I-10 to its northern terminus at I-35, it is designated the Staff Sergeant William J. Bordelon Freeway. Bordelon was the first San Antonio native to receive the Medal of Honor after being killed in action during World War II.

History
Prior to I-37, the routing between Corpus Christi and San Antonio was covered by SH 9 from Corpus Christi to Three Rivers and US 281 from Three Rivers to San Antonio. Beginning in 1971, sections of SH 9 were officially removed from the State Highway System as I-37 was completed. No sections of US 281 were removed from the State Highway System as a result of the construction of I-37, but the two do share the same alignment at two different points between San Antonio and Three Rivers. Also, US 281 was rerouted onto I-37 in San Antonio in 1978.

I-37 was first designated in 1959 to provide a route between San Antonio and Corpus Christi, and construction began in the 1960s. The $11 million project to construct the interchange with I-10 was at the time the largest single contract in the history of the state highway commission. The route was completed by the 1980s. The first sections of the freeway completed were in Corpus Christi. In 1964, the freeway was extended another  westward with the completion of the overpasses at Nueces Bay Boulevard and Buddy Lawrence Boulevard. By 1965, the freeway had been extended west  to Navigation Boulevard. By 1968, the freeway had been completed an additional  further west to Callicoatte Road. The southbound I-37 bridge over the Nueces River was built in 1933 for US 77 (future I-69E) when it was first routed through Corpus Christi. The northbound bridge was built in 1958 with the expansion of US 77 (future I-69E) to four lanes.

Construction in San Antonio also began in the 1960s and was completed in 1972. The first sections were completed in 1967 to include the portion just south of I-410 at the US 181 interchange. The section from Steves Avenue north to Florida Street to include the I-10 interchange was also complete in 1967. In 1968, the section south of I-410 was extended south to Loop 1604. In 1969, the two sections were connected with the completion of overpasses at Goliad Road, Pecan Valley Drive, Fair Avenue, and Hackberry Street as well as the completion of the interchanges at I-410 and Loop 13. The last sections left were on the eastside of downtown. The downtown overpasses at Durango Boulevard, Commerce Street, and the overpass stretching from Houston Street to Jones Avenue were all completed in 1972. The last portion completed in San Antonio was the stack interchange at I-35 (also known as the San Antonio "Downtown Mixer"), near the Pearl Brewery. With the completion of the interchange in 1972, the city had a complete freeway loop in conjunction with I-10 and I-35 around the central business district of the city. At the time construction began in July 1969, the I-35 interchange was the largest highway construction project in state history at $11 million (equivalent to $ in ).

The rural sections of the freeway were completed later than those in the urban areas. Construction of the highway in Corpus Christi and Nueces County continued north over the Nueces River into San Patrico County. The interchange at US 77 (future I-69E) was completed in 1969. The road that was already in existence along this stretch, SH 9, would be utilized as a frontage road as many of the bridges along this stretch were from when SH 9 was built in the 1930s. The mainlanes were extended northward to SH 234 in 1969. By 1970, the freeway had been extended as far north as SH 188. In 1971, I-37 reached Farm to Market Road 888 (FM 888) and service to the city of Mathis. During the mid-1970s, the southern section and northern section were both being extended. The southern section was extended northward in Live Oak County to US 59 (future I-69W) in 1975 and FM 799 in 1976. The northern section saw completion in Atascosa County to FM 541 in 1975 and FM 1099 in 1976. By the early 1980s, the freeway was nearly complete. In 1980, the interchange at US 281 southeast of Pleasanton was complete. With the completion of the interchange at SH 72 and other bridges in the Pleasanton area in 1981, I-37 was complete.

Exit list

See also

Notes

References

External links

Interstate Guide: I-37

37
37
Transportation in San Antonio
Transportation in Corpus Christi, Texas
Transportation in Nueces County, Texas
Transportation in San Patricio County, Texas
Transportation in Live Oak County, Texas
Transportation in Atascosa County, Texas
Transportation in Bexar County, Texas